Wolanów  is a village in Radom County, Masovian Voivodeship, in east-central Poland. It is the seat of the gmina (administrative district) called Gmina Wolanów.

External links
 Jewish Community in Wolanów on Virtual Shtetl

References

Villages in Radom County